Luis Ángel Medina (born May 3, 1999) is a Dominican professional baseball pitcher in the Oakland Athletics organization.

Career

New York Yankees
Medina signed with the New York Yankees as an international free agent in July 2015. He made his professional debut in 2016 with the Dominican Summer League Yankees. In 2017 he pitched for the Dominican Summer League Yankees and Pulaski Yankees. In 2018, he pitched for Pulaski.

Medina started 2019 with the Charleston RiverDogs and was promoted to the Tampa Yankees during the season. The Yankees added Medina to their 40-man roster to protect him from the Rule 5 draft after the 2019 season.

In 2020, Medina did not play a game because of the cancellation of the MiLB season due to the COVID-19 pandemic. He began the 2021 season with the Hudson Valley Renegades and was promoted to the Somerset Patriots during the season. In June 2021, Medina was selected to play in the All-Star Futures Game. The Yankees optioned Medina to Somerset for the 2022 season.

Oakland Athletics
The Yankees traded Medina, JP Sears, Ken Waldichuk, and Cooper Bowman to the Oakland Athletics for Frankie Montas and Lou Trivino on August 1, 2022. Oakland assigned him to the Midland RockHounds.

References

External links

1999 births
Living people
Baseball pitchers
Charleston RiverDogs players
Dominican Summer League Yankees players
Dominican Republic expatriate baseball players in the United States
Hudson Valley Renegades players
Indios de Mayagüez players
Dominican Republic expatriate baseball players in Puerto Rico
People from Nagua
Pulaski Yankees players
Somerset Patriots players
Tampa Tarpons players